Carolina and Northwestern Railway Freight Station is a historic railway station located at Lenoir, North Carolina. Built in 1950, it is listed on the National Register of Historic Places.

History 
The freight station was built in 1950 by Carolina and Northwestern Railway. It was abandoned in the year 1969. The station played an important role in the "substantial post-World War II growth of the furniture industry" in the Piedmont Triad community.

References 

Historic districts on the National Register of Historic Places in North Carolina
Buildings and structures in Caldwell County, North Carolina
National Register of Historic Places in Caldwell County, North Carolina